Cherona is a German pop group cast by the TV station Super RTL. The first single, "Ching Chang Chong" was released on April 24, 2009, and peaked at #15 in the German Top 100. Their follow-up song "Rigga-Ding-Dong-Song", originally by the group Passion Fruit, was also a hit. Both appear in the band's 2009 album Sound of Cherona.

Band members 
Cherona consisted of:
Vicky Chassioti (born in Gevelsberg, Germany, 12 August 1991) - later known as Vicky Chase
David Petters (born in Brandenburg an der Havel, Germany, 24 July 1986)
Milla Chernysheva known as Milla Rock (born in Novovolynsk, Ukraine, 1 December 1987)
Enrico Yakubu Bade (born in Soltau, Germany, 2 November 1987).

Other activities

Vicky Chase 
In November 2009, Vicky Chassioti made her solo debut with the stage name Vicky Chase covering the Banaroo song "Coming Home for Christmas".  The single was released on 20 November 2009 through Na klar! Records. Her first album, Stop Talking, was released on 4 June 2010.

Milla Rock 
Since early 2011 to 2021, Milla Rock sung in the Ukrainian-Canadian rock band Zapovid from Toronto. Zapovid has played at numerous events and festivals in Canada and United States with bands like Mad Heads XL, Los Colorados, Horpyna, Kozak System, and Mandry.

Discography

Albums

Singles 

Other songs
2009: "Sound of Africa (Heyama)"

References

External links 
 Official Page
 Cherona at Toggo.de
Cherona at Bubblegum Dancer

German pop music groups
Musical groups from Cologne